Karl (Charly) Mai (27 July 1928 – 15 March 1993) was a German footballer. He was born in Fürth.

He was part of the West German team that won the 1954 FIFA World Cup. In total he earned 21 caps and scored one goal for West Germany. During his club career he played for SpVgg Fürth and Bayern Munich.

Sepp Herberger compared Mai's playing style to that of 1930s player Andreas Kupfer but also appreciated his solidity and straightness. In the 1954 World Cup Final Mai faced Sandor Kocsis who had scored no less than 11 goals up to that game, yet he failed to score in the final as Mai performed a rigid marking job on Kocsis. Mai was an outspoken player who also did not shy away from stating his opinion towards Herberger.

After his professional career he became a coach in the 1960s and then a school trainer. In the early 1990s, his right lung was removed. He died in 1993.

References

External links
 
 
 

1928 births
1993 deaths
German footballers
Germany international footballers
FC Bayern Munich footballers
SpVgg Greuther Fürth players
1954 FIFA World Cup players
FIFA World Cup-winning players
German football managers
SC Young Fellows Juventus players
Sportspeople from Fürth
Footballers from Bavaria
Association football midfielders
West German footballers
West German expatriate footballers
West German football managers
West German expatriate sportspeople in Switzerland
West German expatriate sportspeople in Austria
Expatriate footballers in Austria
Expatriate footballers in Switzerland